In Greek mythology, Sinoe (Ancient Greek: Σινόης Sinoê means 'mischievous' from sinos) was an oread nymph of Mount Sinoe in Arcadia. She was one of the nurse to the infant god, Pan. The latter was then surnamed as Sinoeis after her.

Note

References 

 Pausanias, Description of Greece with an English Translation by W.H.S. Jones, Litt.D., and H.A. Ormerod, M.A., in 4 Volumes. Cambridge, MA, Harvard University Press; London, William Heinemann Ltd. 1918. . Online version at the Perseus Digital Library
 Pausanias, Graeciae Descriptio. 3 vols. Leipzig, Teubner. 1903.  Greek text available at the Perseus Digital Library.

Dryads
Nymphs